The creamy-bellied thrush (Turdus amaurochalinus) is a species of bird in the family Turdidae. It occurs in a wide range of wooded habitats in a large part of central and eastern South America. It is generally common, even in human altered habitats such as gardens and parks. While the plumage varies from overall greyish to brownish, and the bill from dusky to yellow, adult creamy-breasted thrushes always have distinctive blackish lores. This separates it from other similar thrushes (e.g. the pale-breasted thrush) found in its range.

Gallery

References

External links

creamy-bellied thrush
Birds of Argentina
Birds of Brazil
Birds of Paraguay
Birds of Uruguay
creamy-bellied thrush
Taxonomy articles created by Polbot